Psectra is a genus of brown lacewings in the family Hemerobiidae. There are more than 20 described species in Psectra.

Species
These 26 species belong to the genus Psectra:

 Psectra capensis (Kimmins, 1935)
 Psectra claudiensis New, 1988
 Psectra decorata (Nakahara, 1966)
 Psectra diptera (Burmeister, 1839)
 Psectra externa (Banks, 1909)
 Psectra fasciata (Esben-Petersen, 1928)
 Psectra franzeni (Kimmins, 1940)
 Psectra graeffei (Brauer, 1867)
 Psectra hageni (Banks, 1932)
 Psectra iniqua (Hagen, 1859)
 Psectra irregularis (Carpenter, 1961)
 Psectra jeanneli (Navás, 1914)
 Psectra latilobata New, 1989
 Psectra maculosa (Carpenter, 1961)
 Psectra minima (Banks, 1920)
 Psectra mombassina (Navás, 1936)
 Psectra mozambica Tjeder, 1961
 Psectra nakaharai New, 1988
 Psectra obliqua (Banks, 1909)
 Psectra oblonga (Esben-Petersen, 1928)
 Psectra oriomoense New, 1989
 Psectra pretiosa (Banks, 1909)
 Psectra siamica Nakahara & Kuwayama, 1960
 Psectra tillyardi (Kimmins, 1940)
 Psectra wilhelmensis New, 1989
 Psectra yunu C.-k. Yang, 1981

References

Further reading

External links

 

Hemerobiiformia
Articles created by Qbugbot